Alexis Ricardo Rojas Villalba (born 8 October 1996) is a Paraguayan footballer who currently plays as a right winger for Resistencia S.C. on loan from Cerro Porteño.

References 

1996 births
Living people
Paraguayan footballers
Paraguayan expatriate footballers
Sportivo Luqueño players
Fluminense FC players
Cerro Porteño players
Paraguayan Primera División players
Association football midfielders
Paraguayan expatriate sportspeople in Brazil
Expatriate footballers in Brazil